Joseph Ketchum Edgerton (February 16, 1818 – August 25, 1893) was an American lawyer and politician who served one term as a U.S. Representative from Indiana from 1863 to 1865.

Early life and career 
Born in Vergennes, Vermont, Edgerton attended the public schools of Clinton County, New York. He graduated from Plattsburgh Academy, which his older brother Alfred Peck Edgerton had also attended. Joseph Edgerton read the law with an established firm and was admitted to the bar.

In 1839 he commenced practice in New York City. In 1844 Edgerton moved to Fort Wayne, Indiana, where he continued to practice.

In 1854 he became a member of the board of directors for the Fort Wayne and Chicago Railroad, and later was selected as its president. Edgerton also served as president of the Grand Rapids and Indiana Railroad and the Ohio Railroad, which were constructed to connect major cities of the Midwest, especially the booming industrial city of Chicago, through which many natural resources flowed to the East.

Congress 
A Democrat, Edgerton was elected to the United States House of Representatives in 1862 and served in the Thirty-eighth Congress, March 4, 1863, to March 3, 1865. His vote on the Thirteenth Amendment is recorded as nay. He was an unsuccessful candidate for reelection in 1864 and returned to his business interests.

Death
Edgerton died in Boston, Massachusetts, on August 25, 1893. His body was returned to Indiana, where he was interred at Fort Wayne's Lindenwood Cemetery.

His older brother Alfred Peck Edgerton was elected to Congress for two terms from Ohio. After his death in 1897, his family arranged for his burial in Lindenwood Cemetery.

References

External links

 
 
 

1818 births
1893 deaths
People from Vergennes, Vermont
People from Clinton County, New York
Politicians from New York City
Politicians from Fort Wayne, Indiana
New York (state) lawyers
Indiana lawyers
Democratic Party members of the United States House of Representatives from Indiana
19th-century American politicians
19th-century American lawyers